The First Söder cabinet was the state government of Bavaria from March to November 2018, sworn in on 21 March 2018 after Markus Söder was elected as Minister-President of Bavaria by the members of the Landtag of Bavaria. It was the 26th Cabinet of Bavaria.

It was formed after the resignation of Minister-President Horst Seehofer to become Federal Minister of the Interior, Building and Community; it was a continuation of the Christian Social Union (CSU) majority government formed after the 2013 Bavarian state election. Excluding the Minister-President, the cabinet comprised thirteen ministers and four state secretaries. All were members of the CSU.

The first Söder cabinet was succeeded by the second Söder cabinet on 12 November 2018 following the 2018 Bavarian state election.

Formation 
The previous cabinet was a majority government of the CSU led by Minister-President Horst Seehofer of the CSU. After the CSU suffered heavy losses in the 2017 German federal election, Seehofer announced he planned to resign as Minister-President in early 2018 and have the office to his finance minister Markus Söder. In March 2018, he announced his switch to federal politics after being nominated as Minister of the Interior in the fourth Merkel cabinet. Seehofer formally resigned on 13 March.

Söder was elected as Minister-President by the Landtag on 16 March, winning 99 votes out of 169 cast. His cabinet was sworn in on 21 March.

Composition

External links

References 

Cabinets of Bavaria
State governments of Germany
Cabinets established in 2018
2018 establishments in Germany